Desislava of Bulgaria was a 14th-century Bulgarian princess. She was the daughter of Tsar Ivan Alexander of Bulgaria and his second wife Theodora, a converted Jewish woman.

References

Bulgarian princesses
Bulgarian people of Jewish descent
14th-century births
14th-century Bulgarian people
Year of death unknown
14th-century Bulgarian women
Daughters of emperors